The Netherlands men's cricket team is touring Zimbabwe in March 2023 to play three One Day International (ODI) matches. The ODI series formed part of the inaugural 2020–2023 ICC Cricket World Cup Super League, and both teams' preparations for the 2023 Cricket World Cup Qualifier.

Earlier the series scheduled to be played in September 2020, however, in August 2020, the tour was postponed due to the COVID-19 pandemic. Ahead of the series, the Netherlands played a 50-over warm up match against a Zimbabwe XI side.

Squads

On 16 March 2023, Bas de Leede was ruled out of the series due to heel injury, with Aryan Dutt was named as his replacement.

Tour match

ODI series

1st ODI

2nd ODI

3rd ODI

References

External links
 Series home at ESPNcricinfo

2023 in Zimbabwean cricket
2023 in Dutch cricket
International cricket competitions in 2022–23
Netherlands
Zimbabwe
Cricket events postponed due to the COVID-19 pandemic